Chionosia zonata is a moth of the subfamily Arctiinae first described by George Hampson in 1900. It is found in the South American country of Suriname.

References

Lithosiini